Provincial  may refer to:

Government & Administration
 Provincial capitals, an administrative sub-national capital of a country
 Provincial city (disambiguation)
 Provincial minister (disambiguation)
 Provincial Secretary, a position in Canadian government
 Member of Provincial Parliament (disambiguation), a title for legislators in Ontario, Canada as well as Eastern Cape Province, South Africa.
 Provincial council (disambiguation), various meanings
 Sub-provincial city in the People's Republic of China

Companies
 The Provincial sector of British Rail, which was later renamed Regional Railways
 Provincial Airlines, a Canadian airline
 Provincial Insurance Company, a former insurance company in the United Kingdom

Other Uses
 Provincial Osorno, a football club from Chile
 Provincial examinations, a school-leaving exam in British Columbia, Canada
 A provincial superior of a religious order
 Provincial park, the equivalent of national parks in the Canadian provinces
 Provincial Reconstruction Team, a military unit used by Western forces in Afghanistan
 Provincial Court, a type of law court in Canada
 Provincial symbols such as those of Canada
 Provincial (album), the first solo album by John K. Samson

See also
 Province (disambiguation)
 Vice-provincial (disambiguation)